Mołdzie  ( (1938-45:Mulden)) is a village in the administrative district of Gmina Ełk, within Ełk County, Warmian-Masurian Voivodeship, in northern Poland.

References

Villages in Ełk County